Adrian Joseph Mariappa (born 3 October 1986) is a professional footballer who plays as a defender. Born in England, he represents the Jamaica national team.

He progressed through Watford's youth academy, and started playing for the first team in the 2005–06 season. Although primarily a centre back, he spent some of his early professional career at right back due to competition for places in the middle. In his first spell at Watford, he made 247 first team appearances, including 19 in the Premier League. This included a run of 113 consecutive league appearances, the fourth longest streak in Watford's history. Mariappa captained Watford at under-18, reserve and first-team levels, and was the club's vice captain in his final few years at Vicarage Road.

Mariappa accepted his first call up to Jamaica's international team in May 2012. He won his first cap against Guyana later that month, and transferred to Premier League side Reading in July 2012. He made 29 league appearances for the club before joining Premier League side Crystal Palace in September 2013, following Reading's relegation to the Championship.  Returning to Watford before the 2016–17 season, Mariappa made seven league appearances that season.

Club career

Watford

Born in Harrow, Mariappa joined Watford's youth system at the age of eight. At the age of 15 he was initially told he would be released by the club. While in the Watford academy Mariappa trained with athletics and basketball clubs to improve his sprinting and jumping techniques. He captained the club's under-18 side during their FA Youth Cup quarter final against Tottenham Hotspur, and later captained the reserve team.

Mariappa was selected as an unused substitute in Watford's last league game of the 2004–05 season. After signing his first professional contract with the club that summer, Mariappa made his first team debut in a League Cup match against Notts County on 23 August 2005, playing 90 minutes in a 3–1 Watford win. He made another cup start against Wigan Athletic in the 3rd round. During the 2005–06 season he also made three league appearances, including a clean sheet in his first league start, against Hull City on the final day of the regular season. Mariappa did not play any of Watford's play-off games, but was an unused substitute in the final, in which the team won promotion to the Premier League.

Watford started their 2006–07 Premier League campaign at Everton, with Mariappa starting in central defence in place of first-team regular Jay DeMerit. He was substituted at half-time, and, aside from a League Cup appearance against Accrington Stanley, did not make another first-team appearance until December 2006, when in an away match at Newcastle United he came on for the injured James Chambers at right-back. He continued in that position, playing regularly for the rest of the season.

With Watford back in the Championship for 2007–08, Mariappa found himself largely on the substitute bench, making 13 league starts and 3 in other competitions, as Watford again reached the play-offs. By contrast, he started 45 games in all competitions in the 2008–09 season, under the management of Aidy Boothroyd, Malky Mackay and latterly Brendan Rodgers, and scored his first senior goal for Watford in a 3–1 defeat at Wolves on 31 January 2009. At the end of the season he signed a two-year extension to his contract.

In the absence of injured captain Jay DeMerit, Mariappa skippered Watford for the first time on 12 September 2009, in a 1–0 victory at Vicarage Road against Barnsley. He retained the captaincy during DeMerit's absence, and scored his second senior goal in October 2009, on his 100th professional appearance. Watford finished the 2009–10 season 16th in the Championship; Mariappa was the only player to start each of the club's games in the Football League, FA Cup and League Cup. 2010–11 followed a similar pattern to the previous campaign; Mariappa started every game for which he was available, and was one of Watford's six scorers in the team's 6–1 away win against Millwall. He was also appointed as the club's vice captain during the season. However, Mariappa was sent off for the first time in his career on 19 March 2011, in a 2–1 defeat to Middlesbrough. The resulting suspension ended Mariappa's run of 113 consecutive league appearances, the fourth highest in Watford's history.

Mariappa continued to play in the 2011–12 season under new manager Sean Dyche. He was the focus of transfer speculation during the January 2012 transfer window when Watford received a number of bids for him from Premier League clubs. Three bids from Newcastle United were rejected; an offer from Wigan Athletic was accepted, but Mariappa rejected a move. He stayed at the club until the following summer, and his good form saw players and fans vote him 2011–12 Watford F.C. Player of the Season.

Reading

On 17 July 2012, it was announced that Mariappa had joined Reading on a three-year deal for an undisclosed fee. Media estimates of the transfer fee ranged from £2m to £3m.

Crystal Palace
Mariappa signed for newly promoted Premier League club Crystal Palace on a three-year contract for an undisclosed fee on 2 September 2013.

At the end of his three-year deal, it was confirmed on 13 June 2016 that he would be released by Crystal Palace on expiry of his contract.

Return to Watford
On 30 August 2016, Mariappa re-joined Watford on a three-year deal after a four-year absence. He made his 250th Watford start against West Bromwich Albion in a 1–0 win on 3 March 2018, winning Man of the Match for his performance.

Bristol City 
Following a defensive injury crisis, on 11 November 2020 Bristol City signed Mariappa on a short term deal. On 14 May 2021 he was released by the club at the end of his contract.

Macarthur FC 
On 29 November 2021, A-League Men side Macarthur FC announced that they had signed Mariappa. He made his debut against Western Sydney Wanderers on 11 December 2021 in a 0-2 win as the first Jamaican player to play in the Australian national league.

Burton Albion

On 7 October 2022, he returned to England to sign a short term deal with League One side Burton Albion.

International career
Mariappa is eligible for the Fiji national team through his Fijian father. In late 2010 he was named by the Fiji Football Association in the 50-member national training squad to prepare for the 2011 Pacific Games in New Caledonia, but did not take up the place.

Both of Mariappa's maternal grandparents are from Jamaica. In 2012 he accepted a call up to the Jamaica squad, for a friendly against Guyana. His first match in an international competition came on 9 June 2012, in a 2–1 World Cup qualifying win against Guatemala.

Personal life
Mariappa is of Fijian (paternal) and Jamaican (maternal) descent. As of March 2019, Mariappa had been a vegan for 18 months.

Career statistics

Club

International

Scores and results list Jamaica's goal tally first.

Honours
Watford
Football League Championship play-offs: 2006
FA Cup runner-up: 2018–19

Crystal Palace
FA Cup runner-up: 2015–16

Jamaica
CONCACAF Gold Cup runner-up: 2015

Individual
A-Leagues All Star: 2022

References

External links

Adrian Mariappa profile at Crystal Palace F.C.
Adrian Mariappa profile at the Jamaica Football Federation

1986 births
Living people
Footballers from Harrow, London
English footballers
Jamaican footballers
Jamaica international footballers
Association football defenders
Watford F.C. players
Reading F.C. players
Crystal Palace F.C. players
Bristol City F.C. players
Macarthur FC players
Burton Albion F.C. players 
Premier League players
FA Cup Final players
English Football League players
Black British sportspeople
English people of Jamaican descent
English people of Indo-Fijian descent
2015 Copa América players
2015 CONCACAF Gold Cup players
Copa América Centenario players
2021 CONCACAF Gold Cup players